Murderers is a 2006 French drama film directed by Patrick Grandperret. It was screened in the Un Certain Regard section at the 2006 Cannes Film Festival.

Cast
 Hande Kodja as Nina
 Céline Sallette as Lizzy
 Gianni Giardinelli as Yann Jobert
 Anaïs de Courson as Hélène Jobert
 Isabelle Caubère as Madame Jobert
 Shafik Ahmad as Malik
 Karine Pinoteau as Joanna
 Marc Rioufol as Le père de Nina
 Eugene Durif as Le psychiatre

References

External links

2006 films
2000s French-language films
2006 crime drama films
Films directed by Patrick Grandperret
French crime drama films
2000s French films